Julie Legrand (born in Pitlochry, Scotland) is a British television, film, and stage actress best known for her role as Jeanette Dunkley on Footballers' Wives. She has also guest starred in a wide variety of British television shows, as well as stage productions.

Television
One of her earliest roles was in the Channel 4 comedy drama Hollywood Hits Chiswick, alongside Derek Newark as W.C. Fields.  Her subsequent television career has been extensive, including appearances in Anglo-Saxon Attitudes. Kavanagh QC and Holby City.

Theatre
Along with her television work, Legrand has had numerous successes within theatre, most recently in See How They Run and has also starred in Fiddler on the Roof in the West End at The Savoy theatre and as the Wicked Witch of the West in The Wizard of Oz, along with the films One for the Road, Prick Up Your Ears, and Water. She also toured Britain in the RSC's Romeo and Juliet as The Nurse. She played the role of Madame Morrible in the West End production of Wicked. She began performances on 29 March 2010, replacing Harriet Thorpe. After a lengthy run, Legrand exited the show on 27 October 2012, and was replaced by Louise Plowright on Oct. 29, 2012.  in 2014-2015 Legrand portrayed Electra in Gypsy at the Chichester Festival Theatre and the subsequent transfer to the Savoy Theatre in London. In 2016 Legrand played Mrs. Malaprop in Sheridan's The Rivals in Bristol and Glasgow.

Personal life
Julie Legrand married Simon Clark, a sound engineer, in 2005.

Filmography

References

External links
 

Living people
British actresses
Year of birth missing (living people)